Christian Uphoff (born January 22, 1998) is an American football safety who is a free agent. He played college football for the Illinois State Redbirds.

Early life and high school
Uphoff grew up in Washington, Illinois and attended Washington Community High School.

College career
Uphoff was a member of the Illinois State Redbirds for four seasons, redshirting his true first year. He was named honorable mention All-Missouri Valley Football Conference as a redshirt sophomore after breaking up seven passes with one interception. Although he originally announced that he would play redshirt senior season, which was to be played in the spring due to COVID-19, Uphoff later decided to opt out and prepare for the 2021 NFL Draft.

Professional career
Uphoff signed with the Green Bay Packers as an undrafted free agent shortly after the conclusion of the 2021 NFL Draft. On August 31, 2021, Packers released Uphoff as part of their final roster cuts.

Personal life 
Uphoff is a member of the Church of Jesus Christ of Latter-day Saints and was baptized by his teammate Bronson Kaufusi on August 30th 2021.

References

External links
Illinois State Redbirds bio

Living people
1998 births
Players of American football from Illinois
Sportspeople from Peoria, Illinois
American football safeties
Illinois State Redbirds football players
Green Bay Packers players